GE Artesia Bank was a Dutch financial institution based in Rotterdam and Amsterdam. It was originally established in 1863 as the Nederlandsche Credit and Depositobank.

Company history
The bank has undergone a number of name changes since its inception. In 1872 it became a member of the Paribas group and was renamed Banque de Paris et des Pays-Bas N.V., and in 1984 the name changed to Banque Paribas Nederland NV. On March 11, 1998, following the formation of Artesia Banking Corp., the name changed to Banque Artesia Nederland N.V. On December 28, 2006 the bank was taken over by GE Commercial Finance and now operates under the trade name GE Artesia Bank.

On March 4, 2015, the Dutch newspaper FD reported GE pulled the plug out of GE Artesia Bank.

Services
GE Artesia Bank is situated in Rotterdam and Amsterdam, The Netherlands. GE Artesia Bank offers finance for specific international trade transactions and provides working capital solutions.

Management
Management Board: Hubert Esperon (Chairman, Chief Executive Officer), John-Harold Every (COO) and Johan Benning (Chief Financial Officer).

Senior Management Team: Hubert Esperon (CEO), Johan Benning (CFO), D. Rendell (CRO), J-H Every (COO),B. Schutz (General Counsel), M. Best (Strategic Initiatives) and M. Ilieva (Human Resources Leader).

References

External links 
 
 

Banks based in Amsterdam
Companies based in Rotterdam
General Electric Commercial Finance subsidiaries